Wintilo Vega Murillo (born 13 March 1962) is a Mexican politician formerly affiliated with the Institutional Revolutionary Party. As of 2014 he served as Deputy of the LVI  and LIX Legislatures of the Mexican Congress as a plurinominal representative.

References

1962 births
Living people
Politicians from Guanajuato
Members of the Chamber of Deputies (Mexico)
Institutional Revolutionary Party politicians
National Autonomous University of Mexico alumni
20th-century Mexican politicians
21st-century Mexican politicians
Members of the Congress of Guanajuato
Deputies of the LIX Legislature of Mexico